The 1947 All-Southwest Conference football team consists of American football players chosen by various organizations for All-Southwest Conference teams for the 1947 college football season.  The selectors for the 1947 season included the Associated Press (AP) and the United Press (UP).  Players selected as first-team players by both the AP and UP are designated in bold.

All Southwest selections

Backs
 Bobby Layne, Texas (AP-1)
 Doak Walker, SMU (AP-1)
 Clyde Scott, Arkansas (AP-1)
 Pete Stout, TCU (AP-1)

Ends
 Max Bumgardner, Texas (AP-1)
 Sid Halliday, SMU (AP-1)

Tackles
 Richard Harris, Texas (AP-1)
 Jim Winkler, SMU (AP-1)

Guards
 J. W. Magee, Rice (AP-1)
 Earl Cook, SMU (AP-1)

Centers
 Joe Watson, Rice (AP-1)

Key
AP = Associated Press

UP = United Press

Bold = Consensus first-team selection of both the AP and UP

See also
1947 College Football All-America Team

References

All-Southwest Conference
All-Southwest Conference football teams